Hymn of Busan (부산찬가) is a song performed by South Korean singer Yoon Sinae. This song is a symbol of Busan. This song is Lotte Giants, Busan I'Park FC's cheer song. This song can be heard portion of Busan Subway Line 1's city hall Station. The song was released on 1984.

See also
 Hymn of Seoul

References

External links
 Hymn of Busan

1984 songs
South Korean songs
Culture of Busan
Songs about South Korea
Songs about cities